Llano de Brujas is a district in Murcia, Spain. It is part of the municipality of Murcia and it is located in the northeastern quarter. This district has an area of 7.3 km2 and was inhabited by 5,830 people in 2020.

There is a documentary reference about a hamlet in the district which dates back to 1736.

The territory hosts two localities: Huerta de Llano de Bruja, which has a population of 2,572 in 2020, and El Salar, where 3,258 people lived in the same year.

Demographics 
9.67% inhabitants are foreigners – 2.39% come from other country of Europe, 4.35% are Africans, 2.71% are Americans, and 12 Asian people reside in the territory. The table below shows the population trends of the district.

Festivities 

 Carnival
 Patron saint festivity

References 

Murcia
Populated places in the Region of Murcia